In linguistics, the lexical aspect or Aktionsart (plural Aktionsarten ) of a verb is part of the way in which that verb is structured in relation to time. For example, the English verbs arrive and run differ in their lexical aspect since the former describes an event which has a natural endpoint while the latter does not. Lexical aspect differs from grammatical aspect in that it is an inherent semantic property of a predicate, while grammatical aspect is a syntactic or morphological property. Although lexical aspect need not be marked morphologically, it has downstream grammatical effects, for instance that arrive can be modified by "in an hour" while believe cannot.

Theories of aspectual class
Although all theories of lexical aspect recognize that verbs divide into different classes, the details of the classification differ. An early attempt by Vendler recognized four classes, which has been modified several times.

Vendler's classification
Zeno Vendler classified verbs into four categories on whether they express "activity", "accomplishment", "achievement" or "state". Activities and accomplishments are distinguished from achievements and states in that the first two allow the use of continuous and progressive aspects.  Activities and accomplishments are distinguished from each other by boundedness. Activities do not have a terminal point (a point before which the activity has taken place and after which cannot continue: "John drew a circle"), but accomplishments have one. Of achievements and states, achievements are instantaneous, but states are durative. Achievements and accomplishments are distinguished from one another in that achievements take place immediately (such as in "recognise" or "find"), but accomplishments approach an endpoint incrementally (as in "paint a picture" or "build a house").

Comrie's classification
In his discussion of lexical aspect, Bernard Comrie included the category semelfactive or punctual events such as "sneeze". His divisions of the categories were as follows: states, activities, and accomplishments are durative, but semelfactives and achievements are punctual. Of the durative verbs, states are unique as they involve no change, and activities are atelic (that is, have no "terminal point") whereas accomplishments are telic. Of the punctual verbs, semelfactives are atelic, and achievements are telic. The following table shows examples of lexical aspect in English that involve change (an example of a state is 'know').

Moens and Steedman's classification
Another classification is proposed by Moens and Steedman, based on the idea of the event nucleus

Syntactic analyses of event structure 
Aspectual classes can be analyzed as differing in their event structure, and this has led to the development of syntactic analyses of event structure, with each aspectual class treated as having a distinct syntactic structure.

See also
 Predicate
 Syntax–semantics interface

References

Grammar
Time in linguistics
Syntax–semantics interface

fr:Aspect lexical